May Win Myint is a Burmese politician, physician and former inmate who is currently serving as a Pyithu Hluttaw MP for Mayangon Township and member of the National League for Democracy's Central Executive Committee.

Biography
May Win Myint was on born 8 March 1950 in Moulmein, Mon State, Myanmar. A daughter of Thaung Nyunt and San Thwin. She graduated from the Institute of Medicine-1, Rangoon with a medical degree in 1976 and worked as a part-time doctor for North-Okkalapa and Kyauktada Co-operative Clinics from 1978-1981 and also at Rangoon General Hospital from 1981-1983. From 1983-1988 she worked at the Handicap Hospital and spent a decade practicing medicine in Rangoon, before joining the National League for Democracy in 1988, during the 8888 Uprising.

She contested the Mayangon Township constituency no. 2 and won a Pyithu Hluttaw seat in the 1990 Burmese general election, winning a majority of 28,513 (74% of the votes), but was never allowed to assume her seat. May Win Myint boycotted the National Convention in December 1995 along with other MPs from the National League for Democracy, and is the Secretary of Mayangone Township National League for Democracy. 
On 28 October 1997, she was arrested and charged on 26 November 2007 under the 1950 Emergency Act, after National League for Democracy members tried to meet with Aung San Suu Kyi, who was in house arrest at the time. She was subsequently jailed for 7 years at the Insein Prison, and her prison term was given two one-year extensions. May Win Myint was released on 28 September 2008.

In the 2012 Burmese by-elections, she contested the Mayangon Township constituency and won a Pyithu Hluttaw seat. In the 2015 Myanmar general election,  re-elect Pyithu Hluttaw MP for Mayangon Township.

References

External links

1950 births
Burmese physicians
21st-century Burmese women politicians
21st-century Burmese politicians
Members of Pyithu Hluttaw
National League for Democracy politicians
People from Mawlamyine
Prisoners and detainees of Myanmar
Living people
University of Medicine 1, Yangon alumni